Farm to Market Road 157 (FM 157) is a Farm to Market Road in the US state of Texas, traveling from an exit on Texas State Highway 121 south, through Euless, Bedford, Fort Worth, and Arlington in Tarrant County, then enters Johnson County, and passes through Mansfield, and Venus, before entering Ellis County, and terminating at an intersection with Farm to Market Road 66 in Maypearl. While located in Euless and Bedford, FM 157 is known as Industrial Boulevard, while in Fort Worth, it is known as Collins Street.  In Arlington, the route continues on North Collins, Division, and South Cooper Streets. In Mansfield, the road is known as Main Street and Lone Star Road; in Venus as Main, 8th & 7th Streets; and in Maypearl as Highway 157. The highway passes directly through the center of Euless and Bedford, passing large neighborhoods and businesses. The route passes a large wetland before passing directly through downtown Arlington, passing major attractions such as AT&T Stadium and Globe Life Field. The route passes through the center of the University of Texas at Arlington, and continues through downtown and southern Arlington, before entering Mansfield. The route continues through central Mansfield, and south to Maypearl. The Texas Department of Transportation (TxDOT) designated the route in 1945, and redesignated the portion traveling from SH 121 to US Bus. 287 as Urban Road 157 (UR 157) from 1995 until 2018.

Route description
FM 157 begins at its southern terminus, a three-way intersection with Farm to Market Road 66, in Maypearl.  The highway starts off as a two-lane, paved, asphalt road. After the intersection, the road continues through northern Maypearl, passing several rows of houses and small businesses. Just after exiting the town, the route passes the large Maypearl Cemetery. The route continues through rural farmland, intersecting several small county roads along the way. At an intersection with Farm to Market Road 1446, the road passes a group of houses and farms. For this length of the route, FM 157 is heading almost due northeast. A few miles after the intersection with FM 1446, the highway turns west and continues for about half a mile in that direction. The road then turns northwest again, and passes the large community of Country Acres. The route continues on through miles of open farmland, intersecting with FM 2258 and FM 875, as well as smaller roads. FM 157 then enters Venus. When the road enters Venus, the name changes from Farm Road 157 to 7th Street. Just after entering the town, the route turns west and is renamed 8th street. The highway spends a very short period of time traveling west, before turning northeast again, and becoming Main Street. The highway passes the Venus Post Office, and proceeds through "downtown Venus", passing most of the town's businesses. FM 157 proceeds to pass over three railroad tracks. The route intersects with US Highway 67, and then exits Venus. The highway passes several large farms, before passing through a very large, unnamed, unincorporated community, and continuing towards Mansfield. The highway enters southern Mansfield, and intersects Business U.S. Route 287, and becomes concurrent with the highway. After a few miles of passing several streets, FM 157 becomes its own road again. heading to Arlington, it has an interchange with US 287, intersects Turner Warnell Road at the border of Mansfield and Arlington, becoming South Cooper Street. Going for several miles and having a cloverleaf interchange with Interstate 20 near The Parks Mall at Arlington,, it intersects Pioneer Parkway, or Spur 303. passing for few more miles, it runs through the University of Texas at Arlington. Just after leaving the university, it intersects Division Street, or SH 180, becoming concurrent with the state highway. Heading in an eastern direction with SH 180; it intersects Collins Street, taking the remainder of the route in Arlington heading in a northern direction. Passing the AT&T Stadium and having an interchange with Interstate 30, it goes for a few miles, passing Viridian. After that, it becomes Highway 157 after the crossing of the Fort Worth border. It continues on as Highway 157 for a few miles before passing the Euless border, becoming Industrial Boulevard, intersecting Euless Blvd. (State Highway 10), having an interchange with the recently renovated SH 183 (Airport Freeway), crossing the Bedford border, then merging onto its northern terminus with a partial interchange on SH 121.

History
FM 157 was first designated on June 4, 1945, and traveled from, a junction with US 287 in Mansfield, in Johnson County, northward to the intersection of SH 121 (Ira E. Woods Avenue) and Loop 10 (Dallas Road) in Grapevine, in Tarrant County. Seven days later, on June 11, 1945, the highway was extended from US 287 through Venus and southward to the southern border of Ellis County. On April 14, 1980, the northern  of the route was returned to the city of Grapevine. The remaining  of the route stayed FM 157. On June 26, 2003, a portion of the route was redesignated from Collins Street to Cooper Street, in Arlington. On April 30, 2015, the section concurrent with BU 287-P from FM 917 to the oldFM 157/BU 287-P junction was removed from the state highway system and given to the city of Mansfield, so FM 157 was rerouted along southbound BU 287-P. The portion from US 287 south to BU 287-P was transferred to BU-287-P, and the section along BU 287-P from FM 917 to FM 157 was transferred to FM 917. On July 27, 2017, FM 157 replaced the section of FM 917 south to US 287, and follows US 287 between these areas. On November 15, 2018, the section from SH 121 south to US 287 was redesignated as FM 157 again.

Future
In 2012, TxDOT began discussions for a project for the rerouting of FM 157 from FM 1807 south of Venus north to US 287 in Mansfield. The project would potentially reroute the highway to a more direct path, and take it through several large neighborhoods. The Fort Worth District is currently conducting a feasibility study for the proposed realignment of FM 157 from FM 917 to FM 1807.

Major junctions

See also

References

0157
Transportation in Tarrant County, Texas
Transportation in Ellis County, Texas